The Northland Region is the northernmost of New Zealand's 16 local government regions. New Zealanders sometimes refer to it as the Winterless North because of its mild climate all throughout the year. The main population centre is the city of Whangārei, and the largest town is Kerikeri. At the 2018 New Zealand census, Northland recorded a population growth spurt of 18.1% since the previous 2013 census, placing it as the fastest growing region in New Zealand, ahead of other strong growth regions such as the Bay of Plenty Region (2nd with 15%) and Waikato (3rd with 13.5%).

Geography

The Northland Region occupies the northern 80% (265 km) of the 330 km Northland Peninsula, the southernmost part of which is in the Auckland Region. It is bounded to the west by the Tasman Sea, and to the east by the Pacific Ocean. The land is predominantly rolling hill country. Farming and forestry occupy over half of the land and are two of the region's main industries.

Although many of the region's kauri forests were felled during the 19th century, some areas still exist where this rare giant grows tall. New Zealand's largest tree, Tāne Mahuta, stands in the Waipoua Forest south of the Hokianga Harbour. These kauri forests are also home to Te Raupua (781 m), the highest point in the region. Northland has many endemic plant and invertebrate species such as the endangered snail pūpū harakeke (Placostylus ambagiosus), stick insects and the Northland green tree gecko (Naultinus grayii).

The western coast is dominated by several long straight beaches, the most famous of which is the inaccurately-named 88 km stretch of Ninety Mile Beach in the region's far north. The slightly longer Ripiro Beach lies further south. Two large inlets are also located on this coast, the massive Kaipara Harbour in the south, which Northland shares with the Auckland Region, and the convoluted inlets of the Hokianga Harbour.

The east coast is more rugged, and is dotted with bays and peninsulas. Several large natural harbours are found on this coast, from Parengarenga close to the region's northern tip, then Whangaroa Harbour, and past the famous Bay of Islands down to Whangārei Harbour, on the shores of which is situated the largest population centre. Numerous islands dot this coast, notably the Cavalli Islands, the Hen and Chicken Islands, Aorangaia Island and the Poor Knights Islands.

The northernmost points of the North Island mainland lie at the top of Northland. These include several points often confused in the public mind as being the country's northernmost points: Cape Maria van Diemen, Spirits Bay, Cape Reinga, and North Cape. The northernmost point of the North Island is actually the Surville Cliffs, close to North Cape although the northernmost point of the country is further north, in the Kermadec chain of islands. Cape Reinga and Spirits Bay, however, have a symbolic part to play as the end of the country. In Māori mythology, it is from here that the souls of the dead depart on their journey to the afterlife.

Climate
The region of Northland has an oceanic climate (Cfb in the Köppen climate classification), but a subtropical climate in the Trewartha climate classification, with warm humid summers and mild wet winters. Due to its latitude and low elevation, Northland has the country's highest average annual temperature. However, as with other parts of New Zealand, climate conditions are variable. In summer, temperatures range from 22 °C to 26 °C, occasionally rising above 30 °C. In winter, maximum temperatures vary between 13 °C and 19 °C, while minima vary between 6 °C and 11 °C.

Ground frosts are rare due to the region being encircled by the moderating Pacific and Tasman waters, but light frosts do occur infrequently around Dargaville in the lowlands. The hottest months are January and February. In January 2009, excessive sunlight hours and below-average rainfall resulted in the region being declared a drought zone.

Typical annual rainfall for the region is 1500–2000 mm but varies at different altitudes. Northland has an average of 2000 sunshine hours annually. Winds are predominantly from the southwest. Occasionally in summer, the region experiences stormy conditions from former cyclones which generally become much weaker once they leave tropical latitudes.

Government
The Northland Region has been governed by the present Northland Regional Council since 1989. The seat of the council is in Whangārei.

Regional council members represent 7 constituencies: Te Hiku, Coastal North, Coastal Central, Coastal South, Whangārei City, Kaipara and Hokianga-Kaikohe.

There are three territorial authorities in the region:
 Far North District Council, based in Kaikohe
 Whangarei District Council, based in the city centre. 
 Kaipara District Council, based in Dargaville

Until 1989 Northland was governed by several councils and an earlier Northland Regional Council known as the Northland United Council. (It had been part of Auckland Province from 1853 until government was centralised in 1876. Long after Auckland Province ceased, the region continued to be known as North Auckland.) In 1989, Kaitaia Borough, Mangonui County, Whangaroa County, Bay of Islands County, Hokianga County, and Kaikohe Borough were amalgamated to become the Far North District. Whangarei City, Whangarei County, and Hikurangi Town Councils became the Whangarei District, with Dargaville Borough and Otamatea County becoming the Kaipara District. The Northland Regional Council became a tier of local government above these territorial authorities.

A proposal to merge the three district councils and the regional council into a unitary authority to be known as the Northland Council was rejected by the Local Government Commission in June 2015.

Demography

Northland Region had a population of 179,076 at the 2018 New Zealand census, an increase of 27,387 people (18.1%) since the 2013 census, and an increase of 30,606 people (20.6%) since the 2006 census. There were 64,257 households. There were 88,701 males and 90,375 females, giving a sex ratio of 0.98 males per female. The median age was 42.6 years (compared with 37.4 years nationally), with 37,620 people (21.0%) aged under 15 years, 28,836 (16.1%) aged 15 to 29, 77,595 (43.3%) aged 30 to 64, and 35,025 (19.6%) aged 65 or older.

Ethnicities were 73.1% European/Pākehā, 36.0% Māori, 4.2% Pacific peoples, 3.9% Asian, and 1.7% other ethnicities (totals add to more than 100% since people could identify with multiple ethnicities).

The proportion of people born overseas was 15.8%, compared with 27.1% nationally.

Although some people objected to giving their religion, 49.7% had no religion, 35.6% were Christian, 3.9% had Māori religious beliefs, 0.6% were Hindu, 0.2% were Muslim, 0.5% were Buddhist and 1.7% had other religions.

Of those at least 15 years old, 20,622 (14.6%) people had a bachelor or higher degree, and 30,210 (21.4%) people had no formal qualifications. The median income was $24,800, compared with $31,800 nationally. 16,284 people (11.5%) earned over $70,000 compared to 17.2% nationally. The employment status of those at least 15 was that 60,396 (42.7%) people were employed full-time, 21,138 (14.9%) were part-time, and 7,380 (5.2%) were unemployed.

Māori refer to Northland – and by extension its Māori people – as Te Taitokerau (the northern tide) and Māori language and traditions are strong there. Major tribal groups include Ngāpuhi, Te Aupōuri, Te Rarawa, Ngāti Kahu, Ngāti Kurī and Ngāti Whātua. Several of these tribes form a loose association known as the Muriwhenua.

Approximately one third of the region's population are Māori; the majority of the remainder is of European lineage. Compared to the rest of the country, Pacific Islanders are under-represented in Northland. Although most of the region's European population are British (as is true with the rest of the country), certain other ethnicities are represented as well. These include a sizeable Croatian community from the Dargaville area north, particularly around Kaitaia.

Urban areas 
Northland is New Zealand's least urbanised region, with 50% of the population of  living in urban areas. Whangārei is the largest urban area of Northland, with a population of  The region's population is largely concentrated along the east coast, due to the west coast being more ragged and less suitable for urbanisation.

History

According to Māori legend, the North Island of New Zealand was an enormous fish, caught by the demigod Māui. For this reason, Northland is sometimes referred to as "The tail of the fish", Te Hiku o Te Ika.

Northland iwi claim that Kupe made landfall at the Hokianga (although others claim this was at Taipa) in the northwest of Northland, and thus the region claims that it was the birthplace of New Zealand. Some of the oldest traces of Māori  (fishing villages) can be found here.

If the Māori regard the region as the legendary birthplace of the country, there can be no doubt that it was the European starting-point for the modern nation of New Zealand. Traders, whalers and sealers were among the first arrivals, and the gum and timber of the mighty kauri trees brought more colonisers.

In the Bay of Islands, Russell, formerly known as Kororareka, was the first permanent European settlement and Kerikeri contains many historic buildings, including the Stone Store, New Zealand's oldest extant building. The nearby settlement of Waitangi was of even more significance, as the signing place of New Zealand's founding document, the Treaty of Waitangi between the Māori tribes and the British Crown, on 6 February 1840.

Between 1870 and 1920, the major industry in Northland was kauri gum digging, which by the 1910s was centred around the townships of Ahipara and Houhora.

Economy
The subnational gross domestic product (GDP) of Northland was estimated at NZ$7.86 billion in the year to March 2019, 2.6% of New Zealand's national GDP. The regional GDP per capita was estimated at $42,104 in 2019, the lowest of all New Zealand regions. In the year to March 2018, primary industries contributed $984 million (13.1%) to the regional GDP, goods-producing industries contributed $1.59 billion (21.2%), service industries contributed $4.30 billion (57.1%), and taxes and duties contributed $645 million (8.6%)

The region's economy is based on agriculture (notably beef cattle and sheep), fishing, forestry, and horticulture. Northland has  of horticultural land as of 2017. Significant crops include avocadoes, kumara, kiwifruit, citrus fruit and olives.

Extensive forests are a feature of the Northland landscape. For this reason wood and paper manufacturing industries also make a large contribution to the region's economy. The railway system, which once ran as far north as Donnellys Crossing, has been historically important for the transport of timber via Dargaville to Auckland.

Northland is a favourite tourist destination, especially to the Bay of Islands and the historic town of Kerikeri. Diving and fishing are also popular visitor activities, especially around the Bay of Islands and the Poor Knights Islands.

Northland is home to New Zealand's only oil refinery, located in Marsden Point, a town, close to Whangārei across the harbour. New Zealand's natural fuel resources in Taranaki account for a little under half of the refinery's intake, with the rest coming predominantly from the Middle East. The nearby Marsden A thermal power station originally utilised heavy oil from the refinery for electricity production, but no longer does so.

Notable people

References

External links

 Northland Regional Council
 Northland regional information
 Northland in Te Ara the Encyclopedia of New Zealand
 This is the Place – Northland living history 
 NZ Automobile Association's 101 Must-Do's in Northland

 
Wine regions of New Zealand
Whaling stations in New Zealand